Bettison is a surname. Notable people with it include:

Jim Bettison (Irvine James Bettison), Australian philanthropist, whose estate funds the Adelaide Film Festival's Bettison & James Award
Norman Bettison (born 1956), English police officer
Oscar Bettison (born 1975), British/American composer
Zoe Bettison, Australian politician

See also
Bettison's Folly, tower in Hornsea, East Riding of Yorkshire, England